Alfredo Giannetti (1924–1995) was an Italian screenwriter and film director. He won the Academy Award for Best Original Screenplay in 1962 for his work in Divorce Italian Style.

Selected filmography
 The Railroad Man (1956)
 A Man of Straw (1958)
 Divorce Italian Style (1961)
 L'immorale (1967)
 1870 (1971)
The Automobile (1971)
 Febbre da cavallo (1976)
 Il bandito dagli occhi azzurri (1980)

External links

1924 births
1995 deaths
20th-century Italian screenwriters
Italian male screenwriters
Best Original Screenplay Academy Award winners
Italian film directors
Italian television directors
20th-century Italian male writers